= Lillehammer Olympics =

Lillehammer Olympics may refer to:

- 1994 Winter Olympics, Winter Olympics celebrated in 1994 in Lillehammer, Norway
- 2016 Winter Youth Olympics, Youth Winter Olympics celebrated in 2016 in Lillehammer, Norway
